Svetlana Alekseeva may refer to:
 Svetlana Alekseeva (figure skater) (born 1955), Russian figure skater
 Svetlana Alekseeva (model) (born ), Russian model